Piccadilly is a 1929 British silent drama film directed by E.A. Dupont, written by Arnold Bennett and starring Gilda Gray, Anna May Wong, and Jameson Thomas. The film was filmed on location in London, produced by British International Pictures.

This film initially was released as a silent in February 1929; however, with the advent of sound sweeping through the film industry at the time, the studio re-released the film later the same year in June for cinemas wired for sound. This version included a music score and sound effects by Harry Gordon, along with a five-minute sound prologue titled "Prologue to Piccadilly" that was added to the beginning of the film.  The prologue featured just two actors: Jameson Thomas who plays Valentine Wilmot in the film and John Longden as the man from China.  It was filmed after the main filming was completed. The part-sound version initially was shown in the U.S.

In 2004, the film was re-released by Milestone Films after an extensive restoration, with music scored by Neil Brand, replacing the original music-and-sound effects soundtrack. It appeared in 2004 at film festivals nationwide, and in 2005, it was released on DVD.

Plot
Valentine Wilmot's Piccadilly Circus, a nightclub and restaurant in London, is a great success due to his star attraction: dancing partners Mabel (Gilda Gray) and Vic (Cyril Ritchard). One night, a dissatisfied diner (Charles Laughton) disrupts Mabel's solo with his loud complaints about a dirty plate. When Wilmot investigates, he finds Shosho (Anna May Wong) distracting the other dishwashers with her dancing. He fires her on the spot.

After the performance, Vic tries to persuade Mabel to become his partner personally as well as professionally and to go to Hollywood with him. She coldly rebuffs him because she is romantically involved with Wilmot. That night, Wilmot summons Vic to his office, and before Wilmot can fire him, Vic quits.

This decision turns out to be disastrous for the nightclub. The customers had come to see Vic, not Mabel. Business drops off dramatically. In desperation, Wilmot hires Shosho to perform a Chinese dance. She insists that her boyfriend Jim play the accompanying music. Shosho is an instant sensation, earning a standing ovation after her first performance.

Both Mabel and Jim become jealous of the evident attraction between Shosho and Wilmot. Mabel breaks off her relationship with Wilmot.

One night, Shosho invites Wilmot to be the first to see her new rooms. Mabel has followed the couple and waits outside. After Wilmot leaves, she persuades Jim to let her in. She pleads with her romantic rival to give Wilmot up, saying he is too old for her, but Shosho replies that it is Mabel who is too old and that she will keep him. When Mabel reaches into her purse for a handkerchief, Shosho sees a pistol inside and grabs a dagger used as a wall decoration. Frightened, Mabel picks up the gun, then faints.

The next day, the newspapers report that Shosho has been murdered. Wilmot is charged with the crime. During the ensuing trial, he admits that the pistol is his, but refuses to divulge what happened that night. Jim testifies that Wilmot was Shosho's only visitor. Mabel insists on telling her story. However, she can recall nothing after fainting until she found herself running in the streets. Realizing that either Mabel or Jim must be lying, the judge summons Jim. By then, however, Jim has shot himself at Shosho's mausoleum. As he lies dying, he confesses that he killed Shosho.

Cast
 Gilda Gray as Mabel Greenfield
 Anna May Wong as Shosho
 Jameson Thomas as Valentine Wilmot
 Charles Laughton as a nightclub diner
 Ray Milland as extra in nightclub scene
 Cyril Ritchard as Victor Smiles (as Cyrill Ritchard)
 King Hou Chang as Jim (as King Ho Chang)
 Hannah Jones as Bessie, Shosho's friend and dishwashing supervisor
 John Longden as the man from China (uncredited, appears in the sound prologue)

Reception
In his 15 July 1929 review for The New York Times, Mordaunt Hall observed: "Perhaps the greatest asset of Piccadilly comes from the camera. Mr. Dupont is noted for his unusual touches, and he has not spared them in this production. Even the opening, which ordinarily is but a staid, prosaic list of characters, has become almost a part of the picture. The director has managed to get the most from his situations without overdoing them. Mr. Bennett…has retained in his story the verisimilitude which would be necessary in a novel. The actions are all motivated and swing freely forward without dismal hurdles or detours. … Miss Gray seems to have been rediscovered as an actress. …(She) found it necessary to flee to English studios to have a chance. Of the players besides Miss Gray and Miss Wong, King Ho-Chang gives a good performance as the friend of the Chinese dancer. He is said to be a restaurant owner who went into the picture just for amusement, but he appears to be a finished actor." Hall found that the additional sound and sound effects that "encumbered" the film in its U.S. showing were "distracting".

Rotten Tomatoes rates the film 79% fresh, based on 24 contemporary and modern reviews.

Writing for the British Film Institute, BFI Senior Curator Mark Duguid says: "A film noir before the term was in use, Piccadilly is one of the true greats of British silent films, on a par with the best work of Anthony Asquith or Alfred Hitchcock in the period … notable for qualities not typically associated with British silent films: opulence, passion and a surprisingly direct approach to issues of race … For all its style and grace, the film's strongest suit is Chinese-American actress Anna May Wong … arguably never better used than here. To Wong's frustration, Shosho and Valentine's kiss was cut to appease the US censor ... Naturally, Piccadilly's publicity made much of Wong's exotic beauty: one contemporary poster—for the film's Austrian release—carries an illustration of the star dancing topless. It would have been unthinkable to portray a white actress in this way and, needless to say, no such image appears in the film."

References

External links
 
 
 

1929 films
British black-and-white films
British silent feature films
British crime drama films
1929 crime drama films
Films shot at British International Pictures Studios
Films directed by E. A. Dupont
Films set in London
Films about interracial romance
Works by Arnold Bennett
1920s British films
Silent drama films